The 2020–21 Radford Highlanders men's basketball team represented Radford University in the 2020–21 NCAA Division I men's basketball season. The Highlanders, led by tenth-year head coach Mike Jones, played their home games at the Dedmon Center in Radford, Virginia, as members of the Big South Conference.

Previous season
The Highlanders finished the 2019–20 season 21–11, 15–3 in Big South play to win a share of the regular season championship. They defeated Charleston Southern in quarterfinals of the Big South tournament before losing in the semifinals to Hampton. As a regular season conference champion, and No. 1 seed in their conference tournament, who failed to win their conference tournament, they received and automatic bid to the NIT. However, the NIT, and all other postseason tournaments, were cancelled amid the COVID-19 pandemic.

Roster

Schedule and results

|-
!colspan=12 style=| Regular season

|-
!colspan=12 style=| Big South tournament
|-

|-

Source

References

Radford Highlanders men's basketball seasons
Radford Highlanders
Radford Highlanders men's basketball
Radford Highlanders men's basketball